The L II River is a small spring-fed river in Canterbury, New Zealand. It rises near Lincoln and flows through very flat farmland, mostly fed by land drainage ditches before emptying into Lake Ellesmere / Te Waihora just east of the mouth of the Selwyn River / Waikirikiri.

See also
List of rivers of New Zealand

References

Rivers of Canterbury, New Zealand
Rivers of New Zealand